Ratcliffe Gerard (c.1584 – in or before 1670) of Halsall, Lancashire was an English landowner who served in the Royalist army during the Wars of the Three Kingdoms.

Biography
Ratcliffe and Gilbert were twin sons of Ratcliffe Gerard, and Elizabeth, daughter and heir of Sir Charles Somerset.

Gerard and his two sons, Gilbert and John, joined the Royalist army.  Ratcliffe was a lieutenant-colonel in twin brother's regiment. He was in Raglan Castle at its surrender in 1646, and was one of the few English Royalists to take up arms for Charles II in 1651 and was captured at the Battle of Wigan Lane. In 1658 he was known to be a non-Catholic Royalist activist in Lancashire.

Family
Gerard  married Jennet Barret, daughter of Edward Barret, of Pembrokeshire. They had several children including:
 Gilbert (died 1687) who was created Baronet of Fiskerton 
 John (1632–1654), who was executed for his part in Gerard's conspiracy
 Charles (born 1635)

Notes

References

Cavaliers
Year of birth uncertain
Royalist military personnel of the English Civil War